Best Of Luck Laalu, is a 2017 Gujarati drama film produced by Rashmin Majithia and written and directed by Vipul Mehta. In the film, Smit Ganatra plays the role of a SSC student and Supriya Pathak Kapur (Daksha Modi) as his Mother. Music Director duo Sachin–Jigar has composed the film's score and songs.

The film was released in India on 27 October.

Plot 
The film travels around the life of Laalu, a SSC student. Amatya Modi (Laalu) is from a middle-class family and Amatya's mom wishes that Laalu, who is a grade ‘A’ student further pushes himself to secure a merit rank in the upcoming SSC board exams. The entire family— Laalu, Daksha and even Laalu's happy-go-lucky grandfather Haresh Bhai— rally around the clock the entire school year to fulfill his goal with all the conventional teenage distractions and pressures.

Cast 
 Smit Ganatra as Amatya Modi a.k.a. Laalu
 Supriya Pathak as Daksha Modi, Laalu's Mother.
 Muni Dilip Jha as Haresh Bhai, Laalu's Dadaji.
 Simran Natekar as Forum Shah
 Devarshi Trivedi as Sushil Sampat, Laalu's best friend
 Rishabh Joshi as Vicky Ganatra

Soundtrack
Music Director duo Sachin–Jigar has composed the film's music with songs like ‘Nayan Ne Bandh Rakhi Ne’ sung by Sachin Sanghvi and lyrics by Niren Bhatt, ‘Luv U Luv U’ sung by Kirtidan Gadhvi, Shirley Setia & Sachin–Jigar.

References

External links
 

Indian drama films
2010s Gujarati-language films